Schiedam Centrum is a railway station and metro station in Schiedam, just to the west of Rotterdam, Netherlands, on the railway line between The Hague and Rotterdam Centraal. Train services are operated by Nederlandse Spoorwegen, and metro, tram and bus services are operated by Rotterdamse Elektrische Tram.

History
The station opened on 3 June 1847 as Schiedam, with The Hague – Rotterdam railway line.  The branch to Maassluis opened in 1891, extended to Hook of Holland (Hoek van Holland) two years later. In 1967 the station was renamed Schiedam-Rotterdam West, and in 1998 it was renamed again to Schiedam Centrum.

In 2000, the railway building was completely renewed as part of the extension of the East-West Line of the Rotterdam Metro, which has called at Schiedam Centrum since November 2002.

In 2017, railway services to Hook of Holland ceased as the line would be converted for metro operations.  Service to Hook of Holland resumed on 30 September 2019, now operated by RET Metro Line B.

Incidents
In 1856 the first major train accident in the Netherlands occurred near Schiedam causing three deaths.

In 1976 there was a major train disaster near the station, resulting in 24 deaths.

Services

Train Services
The following services call at Schiedam Centrum:

2x per hour intercity Amsterdam - Haarlem - Leiden - The Hague - Rotterdam - Dordrecht - Roosendaal - Vlissingen
2x per hour intercity Lelystad - Almere - Amsterdam South - Schiphol - The Hague - Rotterdam - Dordrecht (not in the evening and Sundays)
2x per hour intercity Venlo - Eindhoven - ‘s-Hertogenbosch - Utrecht - Amsterdam - Schiphol - Leiden - The Hague - Rotterdam - Dordrecht (only in the evening and Sundays).
4x per hour local service (sprinter) The Hague - Rotterdam - Dordrecht

Metro Services
Schiedam Centrum is an important station on Rotterdam Metro lines A, B, and C.  Just west of the station is the junction where Lines A and B diverge from Line C to head toward Hoek van Holland Haven metro station.  Outside of peak periods, it is also the western terminus of Line A.

Tram and Bus Services
Several Rotterdam tram and bus lines call at Schiedam Centrum. A tram stop for RET lines 21 and 23 is near the entrances of the railway and the metro station.

References

External links
NS website 
Dutch Public Transport journey planner 

Railway stations opened in 1847
Railway stations in South Holland
Rotterdam Metro stations
Railway stations on the Oude Lijn
Railway stations on the Hoekse Lijn
1847 establishments in the Netherlands
Buildings and structures in Schiedam
Railway stations in the Netherlands opened in 1847